Jimalalud, officially the Municipality of Jimalalud, is a 4th class municipality in the province of Negros Oriental, Philippines. According to the 2020 census, it has a population of 32,256 people.

History
Jimalalud was founded in 1797 as part of Tayasan. In 1910, it was separated from Tayasan and became an independent municipality.

Boundless sugar cane fields, typical of the northern landscape, fill the lush lands of Jimalalud most months of the year. It has reported rich deposits of coal, copper, iron and related compounds of magnetite, pyrites and marcasite, but the lodes remain untouched.

In the late 1800s the Recollects built here a convent of hardwoods, an imposing structure that was reputed to be the biggest convent in the Province for over a quarter of a century. The Revolution against Spain compelled the friars to leave and the convent fell into disrepair. Jimalalud was made a town independent of Tayasan in 1910. In 1944 World War II guerillas burned down the entire town, leaving Jimalalud without a historical landmark standing. Barrio Bankal was the seat of the 7th District Government during World War II.

Most times, Jimalalud is serene and green, and the plaza is the picturesque public space for imbibing the town's pastoral ambience.

Geography
Jimalalud has a land area of 139.50 square kilometers (53.86 sq mi). The town is bounded by La Libertad to the north and Tayasan in the south. It faces the Tañon Strait in the east while the eastern part is mostly the mountainous part of the municipality.

Barangays

Jimalalud is politically subdivided into 28 barangays with North and South Poblacion as the center of governance, trade & commerce.

Climate

Demographics

Economy 

The annual regular revenue of Jimalalud for the fiscal year of 2016 was ₱86,004,882.49, according to the record from the Bureau of Local Government Finance.

Culture

Hambabalud Festival
Each 13-15th day of January, the town celebrated its annual fiesta with "Sinulog de Jimalalud" as one of the highlight event. The pageantry of its revived Sinulog keeps Jimalalud's religious and cultural heritage alive in a colorful way. Fiesta time and other special occasions usually bring on the town's stallions for the exciting, if brutal, spectacle of the Paaway sa Kabayo.

Education
There are 3 high school in the town, the nationally funded Jimalalud National High School in South Poblacion with extension in Baranggay Tamao & Owacan National High School, and Infant King Academy manage by Religious of the Virgin Mary (RVM).

References

External links
 [ Philippine Standard Geographic Code]
Philippine Census Information
Local Governance Performance Management System 

Municipalities of Negros Oriental